Ernst Werner Techow (12 October 1901 – 9 May 1945) was a German right-wing assassin. In 1922, he took part in the assassination of the Foreign Minister of Germany Walther Rathenau. After his release from prison Techow initially joined the Nazi party, but soon fell out with the movement and dropped into obscurity. Late in World War II he joined the Volkssturm. He was killed after being captured by the Soviet Red Army near Dresden on 9 May 1945. Techow supposedly changed his political beliefs after his release from prison, joined the French Foreign Legion under the name of "Tessier" and later embarked on helping Jews escape from occupied France. This unfounded narrative can be traced back a story by George W. Herald of Harper's Magazine in 1943.

Early life
Techow came from a distinguished magistrate's family in Berlin; his grandfather had been one of the heroes of the liberal revolution of 1848. In 1918 Techow volunteered for the German navy. After the German revolution of November 1918 he came into contact with counter-revolutionary forces. He joined Marinebrigade Ehrhardt and participated in the Kapp Putsch. After the dissolution of the Free Corps he connected himself with the Organisation Consul, the secret follow organization of the Marinebrigade Ehrhardt. Like many of his comrades he was also a member of the violently antisemitic Deutschvölkischer Schutz und Trutzbund.

Assassination of Walther Rathenau
On 24 June 1922, two months after the signing of the Treaty of Rapallo, 1922, Rathenau was assassinated by two members of the secret, far-right Organisation Consul, Erwin Kern and Hermann Fischer. On that morning, he was driving from his house in Grunewald to the Foreign Office in the Wilhelmstraße, as he did nearly daily. During the trip his vehicle was passed by another in which three men were sitting. While passing, Kern shot Rathenau with an MP 18 submachine gun and Fischer threw a hand grenade into the car, before Techow quickly drove them away. A memorial stone in the Koenigsallee in Berlin-Grunewald marks the scene of the crime. Rathenau was fervently mourned in Germany. The news of his death lead to turmoil in the Reichstag and prompted millions of Germans to rally against terrorism.

Arrest and trial
Since a confidant bragged about the plot in public, the assassins were identified within days. Techow was turned in by relatives on 29 June. Kern and Fischer managed to escape their pursuers until they were cornered in the Thuringian castle Saaleck on July 17. After Kern was killed by a stray bullet, Fischer took his own life. So at the murder trial in October 1922 Techow was the only defendant indicted for murder. He narrowly escaped capital punishment, when in a last-minute confession he convinced the court that he had acted under duress, as Kern threatened to kill him when he tried to withdraw from the murder plot. Thus he got away with 15 years in prison for accessory to murder. He also may have benefitted by a letter which had been written by Mathilde Rathenau, the victim's mother, to Techow's mother: In grief unspeakable, I give you my hand. You, of all women, the most pitiable. Say to your son that in the name and spirit of him who was murdered, I forgive, even as God may forgive, if before an earthly judge he makes a full and frank confession of his guilt, and before a heavenly one repent. Had he known my son, the noblest man earth bore, he had rather turn the weapon on himself than on him. May these words give peace to your soul....

Techow's sentence was reduced by an amnesty in 1928. Upon his release from Roter Ochse prison in Halle, Saxony-Anhalt on 7 January 1930 he was welcomed by delegations of the local chapters of Der Stahlhelm, the German National People's Party and the NSDAP. Techow himself joined the Nazi party, the SA and the editorial staff of the Berlin Nazi newspaper Der Angriff in early 1931. Alienated by Hitler's politics he took part in the Stennes Revolt and was expelled from the party in April 1931. His last noted public appearance was in October 1933, when a monument for his fellow assassins Fischer and Kern was unveiled in Saaleck. In 1934 he published an apologetic pamphlet about Rathenau's assassination.

During the following years Techow worked for the Deutsche Umsiedlungs-Treuhand-Gesellschaft. In May 1941 he enlisted in the German navy. He was a war correspondent, until he was severely injured while the ship he was on was sunk in October 1942. Shortly before the end of the war he joined the Volkssturm. He was taken prisoner of war at the military training ground of Königsbrück near Dresden and allegedly killed by a Soviet soldier because of a misunderstanding. The certified date of his death is 9 May 1945.

The legend of "Tessier"
In April 1943 the American journalist George W. Herald published the story "My favorite Assassin". He claimed to have met a captain of the French foreign legion with the name of Tessier in 1940. This captain, Herald claimed, turned out to be Ernst Werner Techow. He had been deeply moved by Mathilde Rathenau's letter, abstained from antisemitism and joined the French foreign legion. In 1941, Herald further reported, Techow-Tessier helped save hundreds of Jews in Marseilles.

Although this story was soon called into question because of some major inconsistences it still took on a life of its own. By reconstructing Techow's biography historian Martin Sabrow has proved the story to be completely unfounded.

In popular media
Conspiracy against the Republic: Der Mord an Walther Rathenau The assassination of Walther Rathenau directed by Heinrich Billstein
Jack Mayer's award-winning historical fiction, "Before the Court of Heaven" (2015) tells the story of Rathenau's assassination and Ernst Werner Techow's complex and harrowing redemption.

Bibliography
Notes

References

 - Total pages: 276 

German assassins
1901 births
1945 deaths
20th-century Freikorps personnel
Imperial German Navy personnel of World War I
Sturmabteilung personnel
People from Berlin
People from the Province of Brandenburg
Kapp Putsch participants
Volkssturm personnel
German prisoners of war in World War II held by the Soviet Union
Walther Rathenau